Konstantinos Kotsaris (born 25 July 1996) is a Greek professional footballer who plays as a goalkeeper for Super League 2 club Apollon Smyrnis. He has represented his country at youth international levels.

Career

Panathinaikos
Kotsaris made his senior debut for Panathinaikos on 8 January 2015, in a Greek Cup match against Chania.
On 11 November 2018, in an away 1–1 draw against rivals Olympiacos forced to replace the first choice keeper Sokratis Dioudis, as the latter suffered a face injury in a strong aerial challenge from Bibras Natcho. It was his first appearance in Super League and has shown an incredible stability despite his first match.

Apollon Smyrnis
On 14 September 2020, Apollon Smyrnis officially announced the signing of the greek goalkeeper on a free transfer.

Career statistics

References

1996 births
Living people
Footballers from Athens
Greek footballers
Greece under-21 international footballers
Greece youth international footballers
Greek expatriate footballers
Association football goalkeepers
Super League Greece players
Panathinaikos F.C. players
AC Omonia players
Apollon Smyrnis F.C. players
Greek expatriate sportspeople in Cyprus
Expatriate footballers in Cyprus